You've Got to Be Smart (alternatively titled: The Smart Ones) is a 1967 low-budgeted drama film directed by Ellis Kadison and starring Tom Stern, Roger Perry, Gloria Castillo, and Mamie Van Doren. The film was released in few theaters in 1967.

Cast
Tom Stern – Nick Sloane
Roger Perry – Jery Harper
Gloria Castillo – Connie Jackson
Mamie Van Doren – Miss Hathaway
Preston Foster – D.A. Griggs
Jeff Bantam – Methusaleh Jones
Mike Bantam – Methusaleh's brother
Fritz Bantam – Methusaleh's brother

References

1967 films
1967 drama films
American drama films
1960s English-language films
1960s American films